Percy Adams may refer to:

 Percy Adams (cricketer) (1900–1962), English cricketer
 Percy Adams (footballer) (1914–1984), footballer who played for Port Vale in the 1930s
 Henry Percy Adams (1865–1930), English architect